Danger Days may refer to:

 Danger Days, a 2019 EP by Yellow Claw
 Danger Days: The True Lives of the Fabulous Killjoys, a 2010 album by My Chemical Romance